Ioannis Theodoropoulos was a Greek pole vaulter.  He competed at the 1896 Summer Olympics in Athens. He was born in Evrytania. Theodoropoulos competed in the pole vault.  He tied with fellow Greek Evangelos Damaskos for third place in the event, with a height of 2.60 metres.

References

External links

Year of birth missing
Year of death missing
Greek male pole vaulters
Olympic athletes of Greece
Athletes (track and field) at the 1896 Summer Olympics
19th-century sportsmen
Olympic bronze medalists for Greece
People from Evrytania
Olympic bronze medalists in athletics (track and field)
Medalists at the 1896 Summer Olympics
Place of death missing
Sportspeople from Central Greece
19th-century Greek people